Sway & King Tech is an American hip hop duo composed of Bay Area rapper Sway and DJ King Tech.

Also known as Flynamic Force or Sway & Tech, they are the hosts of the nationally syndicated show, The Wake Up Show.

In addition to their radio hosting, they have released four albums, mostly featuring other rappers, much of which was recorded while on their program. The duo is best known for their hit single, "The Anthem" from 1999's This or That which featured a collection of rappers including RZA, Eminem, Tech N9ne, Xzibit, Pharoahe Monch, Jayo Felony, Chino XL, KRS-One and Kool G Rap.

Discography
Flynamic Force (1988)
Concrete Jungle (1991)
This or That (1999)
Back 2 Basics (2005)

References

External links
 

Hip hop groups from California
Musical groups from San Francisco
Rappers from the San Francisco Bay Area
Giant Records (Warner) artists
Hip hop duos
American musical duos
American radio personalities